The Show, officially titled YG Palm Stage ― 2021 Blackpink: The Show, was the first online concert by South Korean girl group Blackpink in support of their debut Korean studio album, The Album.

Background
South Korean girl group Blackpink released their first Korean-language studio album, The Album, on October 2, 2020. It received generally favourable reviews from music critics, and was one of the world's best-selling albums of 2020. To promote the album, Blackpink announced their first online pay-per-view concert, The Show, for December 27, 2020. However, due to COVID-19 pandemic regulations in South Korea at the time, the concert was postponed to January 31, 2021. Under a partnership between the group's label YG Entertainment and YouTube Music, it was the first concert in YG Entertainment's online concert series "YG Palm Stage". A promotional teaser for the concert was first released on November 23, 2020. It was available exclusively on Blackpink's YouTube channel and included first-time performances of songs from The Album.

Concert synopsis
The Show opened with "Kill This Love", following a video featuring sights of dark and empty cities around the world. Apart of live performances it also included several pre-recorded tracks. Each member performed their own solo stage; Jennie performed her song "Solo" with new rap lyrics written by her, and Rosé shared a preview of her solo debut "Gone", while Jisoo and Lisa performed covers of Tove Lo's "Habits (Stay High)" and Doja Cat's "Say So" respectively, both adding new self-written lyrics. The concert ended with an encore featuring a performance of "Forever Young" in which the stage was filled with messages from Blinks (Blackpink's fandom name).

Set list

 "Kill This Love"
 "Crazy Over You"
 "How You Like That"
 "Don't Know What To Do"
 "Playing with Fire"
 "Lovesick Girls"
 "Habits (Stay High)" (cover) (Jisoo solo)
 "Say So" (cover) (Lisa solo)
 "Sour Candy"
 "Love To Hate Me" / "You Never Know"
 "Solo" (Jennie solo)
 "Gone" (Rosé solo)
 "Pretty Savage"
 "Ddu-Du Ddu-Du" 
 "Whistle"
 "As If It's Your Last"
 "Boombayah"
Encore
 "Forever Young"

Reception
In an article for Billboard, Jeff Benjamin noted, "While members Jisoo, Jennie, Rosé and Lisa brought their superstar sensibilities to some of their biggest hits such as "How You Like That" and "Ddu-Du Ddu-Du", The Show... also put on full display how [Blackpink] is pushing themselves as ever-evolving entertainers offering new twists and unexpected elements to the stage." Bridget Lam of South China Morning Post felt that "[e]ven though it was fully online, viewers could feel their presence from wherever they were", and concluded, "The Show was extremely enjoyable from start to finish." Rhian Daly from the British magazine NME gave the concert a four-star rating out of five, and said, "Despite getting an energetic boost from their backing band, not every moment of The Show hits as hard as you would expect in a bouncing arena. ... though, [Blackpink] put on a concert that's a joy to watch." In the concert review, Varietys Ilana Kaplan credited "the group's choreography to their flashy costumes of tulle, feathers and corsets, the production" that made the audience "feel like they had an actual seat at the Seoul venue."

The countries that had the most virtual concertgoers were the United States (gathering around 19.2% of the total concertgoers), Thailand, Philippines, Japan and Mexico.

Live album

Blackpink 2021 'The Show' Live is the fourth live album by Blackpink, released on June 1, 2021, featuring performances from The Show.

On May 11, 2021, YG Entertainment revealed the live CD for "The Show" on its official shop YG Select. Set to release on June 11, the physical album contained a digipack, 2 CD discs, a photobook, 2 random photocards, and a random sticker. YG also announced that Jisoo and Lisa's solo songs on "The Show" were not included on the album due to copyright issues.

The live album was surprise released for digital download and streaming platforms on June 1, 2021. The same day, YG Entertainment opened pre-ordered for KiT VIDEO and DVD versions of "The Show", set to release on June 18. The KiT VIDEO version included one of four different KiT VIDEOS, one of four different key-ring charms, a photocard sleeve set, and a tracklist card, while the DVD version included 2 DVDs, a photobook, a frame photo set, a random magnet set, a tracklist card, random photo cards, a sticker set, an accordion book, a post card set, and a folded poster.

Track listing 
"Kill This Love"
"Crazy Over You"
"How You Like That"
"Don't Know What to Do"
"Playing with Fire"
"Lovesick Girls"
"Love to Hate Me + You Never Know"
"Solo"
"Gone"
"Pretty Savage"
"Ddu-Du Ddu-Du"
"Whistle"
"As If It's Your Last"
"Boombayah"
"Forever Young"

Charts

Weekly charts

Monthly charts

Certifications and sales 

|}

Release history

References 

2021 concerts
Music events postponed due to the COVID-19 pandemic
2021 live albums
Blackpink albums
YG Entertainment live albums
Livestreams